Erosion is the gradual removal of a substance by chemical or mechanical means. 

Erosion may also refer to:

Erosion (dermatopathology) 
Erosion (morphology)
Acid erosion or tooth erosion
Aeolian erosion or wind erosion
Bank erosion
Fluvio-thermal erosion
Bone erosion
Coastal erosion
Soil erosion

See also